John LeConte (December 4, 1818 – April 29, 1891) was an American scientist and academic. He served as president of the University of California from 1869 to 1870 and again from 1875 to 1881.

Biography
LeConte was born in Liberty County, Georgia, to Louis Le Conte, patriarch of the noted LeConte family. He attended Franklin College at the University of Georgia (UGA) in Athens, where he was a member of the Phi Kappa Literary Society and graduated in 1838. His younger brother Joseph LeConte also attended the University.

Like many of his immediate relatives, John LeConte next studied medicine at the New York College of Physicians and Surgeons and earned his M.D. in 1842. During this time, LeConte married Eleanor Josephine Graham. He practiced medicine until 1846 when he returned to UGA as a professor of physics and chemistry and taught there until his resignation in 1855. His next academic position was at the University of South Carolina in Columbia, as professor of physics and chemistry from 1856 until 1869.

In March 1869, he moved to Oakland, California, to join the faculty of the newly established University of California as a professor of physics. In June 1869, he was appointed acting president of the University, serving until Henry Durant became the president in 1870.  In September 1869, his brother Joseph LeConte arrived in California to join the faculty of the University as a professor of geology.

LeConte was elected as a member to the American Philosophical Society in 1873 and the National Academy of Sciences in 1878. 

Upon the resignation of President Gilman in March 1875, LeConte was appointed acting president a second time until June, 1876, when he was elected president. On June 7, 1881, LeConte tendered his resignation as president of the University, asking to be returned to his faculty position.

LeConte died at his home in Berkeley, on April 29, 1891, while still active as a professor of physics.

LeConte and his brother, Joseph, were white supremacists, and a building named in their honour at UC Berkeley was renamed, as announced on July 7, 2020, due to the LeConte brothers' vigorous white supremacy writings in that regard.

Contributions to physics 
LeConte contributed major discoveries to physics throughout the 19th century. In 1858, he demonstrated that flames are sensitive to sound and in 1864, LeConte successfully measured the speed of sound.

LeConte began studying underwater vibrations in 1882.

References 

 UC Berkeley Biography, John LeConte

External links 

History of the University of Georgia by Thomas Walter Reed, Thomas Walter Reed, Imprint:  Athens, Georgia : University of Georgia, ca. 1949, pp.398-400
San Francisco Street Names
National Academy of Sciences Biographical Memoir

1818 births
1891 deaths
University of Georgia alumni
University of Georgia faculty
University of California, Berkeley faculty
University of South Carolina faculty
People from Macon, Georgia
University of California regents
People from Liberty County, Georgia
Leaders of the University of California, Berkeley
Columbia University Vagelos College of Physicians and Surgeons alumni
American white supremacists